Vondelingenplaat is a district in Rotterdam, Netherlands.

Neighbourhoods of Rotterdam